Westhorpe may refer to the following places in England:
Westhorpe, Lincolnshire
Westhorpe, Nottinghamshire
Westhorpe, Suffolk
site of Westhorpe Hall
Westhorpe House, Buckinghamshire

See also 
Westhorp
Westthorpe